The EMD NW3 was a  road switcher diesel-electric locomotive built by General Motors Electro-Motive Division of La Grange, Illinois between November 1939 and March 1942. A total of seven were built for the Great Northern Railway, the sole original purchaser; they were originally numbered #5400-5406 and later renumbered #175-181.

The locomotive fundamentally consists of an NW2 hood, prime mover (a V12 EMD 567 diesel engine) and main generator on a long frame with road trucks (Blomberg Bs). The extra length was used for a large cab and an additional, full-width hood section, which contained a steam generator for passenger service. The boiler's exhaust was in the front center of the cab, between the front windows and exiting at the middle of the roof front.

The locomotives were delivered in GN's black diesel paint scheme of the time, but were later repainted in the bright, orange and green "Empire Builder" scheme. The short exhaust stacks as delivered were at some point replaced by standard conical EMD switcher stacks.

The first four locomotives were traded in by GN to EMD on new locomotives in 1965. The remaining three locomotives were sold to other railroads: #179 was sold to A.E. Staley Co. of Morrisville, Pennsylvania, keeping the same number; then locomotive #179 was purchased by Locomotive Trouble Shooters, from Fairless Hills, PA 19030 and the engine was replaced, #180 was sold to the Clinchfield Railroad as their #361; #181 went to Anaconda Aluminum as their #100. The Clinchfield locomotive was scrapped; the Anaconda Aluminum unit is on display at the Whitefish, Montana depot in its GN "Empire Builder" colors, locomotive #179 was still in service in Morrisville, Pennsylvania until 2019 when it was scrapped.

See also
 List of GM-EMD locomotives

References

 
 Ringnalda, Ben. GN EMD NW3 Roster. Retrieved on January 24, 2005

External links
 

B-B locomotives
NW3
Great Northern Railway (United States) locomotives
Diesel-electric locomotives of the United States
Railway locomotives introduced in 1939
Standard gauge locomotives of the United States
Passenger locomotives